Tom Mauchahty-Ware (March 21, 1949 – November 3, 2015) was a Kiowa/Comanche musician. He was known for his work playing the Native American flute, and has been a successful American Indian dancer, and has sung in a popular blues band.  He was also a skilled traditional artist: painting, sculpting, making flutes, bead working, and feather working. He was a descendant of the famous Kiowa flutist, Belo Cozad, and made two commercial recordings, Flute Songs of the Kiowa and Comanche (1978) and The Traditional and Contemporary Indian Flute of Tom Mauchahty Ware (1983).

Films
Songkeepers (1999, 48 min.).  Directed by Bob Hercules and Bob Jackson.  Produced by Dan King.  Lake Forest, Illinois: America's Flute Productions.  Five distinguished traditional flute artists - Tom Mauchahty-Ware, Sonny Nevaquaya, R. Carlos Nakai, Hawk Littlejohn, Kevin Locke – talk about their instrument and their songs and the role of the flute and its music in their tribes.

References

Native American flautists
Native American painters
Native American bead artists
Native American sculptors
Kiowa people of Comanche descent
Kiowa people
1949 births
2015 deaths
Native American flute players
Place of birth missing